AEL was a motorcycle and accessories dealer in Coventry, England who assembled bikes between 1919 and 1924 using frames probably manufactured in Coventry. Engines ranged from 147cc to 348cc, and were provided by companies such as Villiers, JAP and Blackburne.

References

External links
 1923 advertisement

Motorcycle manufacturers of the United Kingdom